Style is a 2006 Indian Telugu-language dance film written, and directed by Raghava Lawrence. Produced by Larsco entertainments, the film starred Prabhu Deva, Raghava Lawrence, Raja, Kamalinee Mukherjee, and Charmme Kaur in important roles, with Chiranjeevi and Nagarjuna in cameo appearances. The film's soundtrack is composed by Mani Sharma, and is Lawrence's second directorial venture after Mass. The film garnered the Filmfare Award for Best Choreography. The film was subsequently dubbed into Tamil as Lakshyam. The film won two Nandi Awards.

Plot
Ganesh is a famous dancer and beats Anthony in a dance competition to head into the international arena. Infuriated, Anthony arranges an accident for Ganesh, in which Ganesh loses his legs and cannot dance anymore. He becomes depressed and suicidal, but his sister Priya consoles him and tells him to teach someone who could get benefited. Ganesh aims to set up a dance school and starts his search for a competent dancer and finds about Raghava, who works as a cleaning boy at a dance school in Visakhapatnam. Ganesh learns about him and his four friends and makes them his students. The rest of the movie revolves around their training and budding love between Priya and Raghava. Finally, Raghava and his batch defeat Anthony's batch on the dance floor. The movie ends with a film offer to Raghava, given by actor Chiranjeevi.

Cast

Soundtrack

The music was composed by Mani Sharma. Music was released on MADHURA Entertainment Music Company.
Telugu version

Tamil version
"Neruppai" — Karthik
"Style Style" — Jaigeetha, Ravivarma
"Superstar" — Karthik
"Unnil Ulladhu" — Karthik
"Vaada Vaada" — Tippu
"Yaarumillai" — Karthik

Production and release
Style was the highest budgeted dance-musical in India at the time of its release. It was the first south Indian film to be shot with Super 35 camera. Style was the first south Indian film to be color corrected. This film was dubbed in Tamil with the title Lakshyam.

Awards
Filmfare Awards South
Filmfare Award for Best Dance Choreographer - South - Lawrence Raghavendra (2006)

Nandi Awards - 2006
Best Choreographer - Raghava Lawrence  
Best Child Actor - Master Raghava

References

External links

2006 films
2010s dance films
Indian dance films
Films scored by Mani Sharma
2000s Telugu-language films
Films about disability in India
Films directed by Raghava Lawrence